Galeodea echinophora, the spiny bonnet or helmet shell, is a species of large sea snail, a marine gastropod mollusk in the family Cassidae, the helmet snails and bonnet snails.

The fossil record of this species dates back from the Miocene to the Quaternary (age range: 23.03 to 0.781 million years ago). These fossils have been found in India, Spain and Italy.

Description

The shell is globular or oval, with a large body whorl. The surface of the shell is yellowish-brown. The aperture is wide, with denticulate lips, a curved siphonal canal and a large columellar edge. Tubercles are quite variable, usually not very pronounced and may be entirely absent. These mollusks are carnivorous and eat mostly echinoderms, especially Echinocardium cordatum.

Distribution and habitat
This species can be found in the Eastern Mediterranean Sea and in the North Atlantic Ocean, mainly in Western Africa. It lives on sandy and muddy bottoms over 10 m in depth.

References

 Arianna Fulvo et Roberto Nistri (2005). 350 coquillages du monde entier. Delachaux et Niestlé (Paris) : 256 p.
 Beu A.G. (2008) Recent deep-water Cassidae of the world. A revision of Galeodea, Oocorys, Sconsia, Echinophoria and related taxa, with new genera and species (Mollusca, Gastropoda).

echinophora
Molluscs of the Atlantic Ocean
Molluscs of the Mediterranean Sea
Gastropods described in 1758
Taxa named by Carl Linnaeus